Rensch is a German surname. Notable people with the surname include:

Bernhard Rensch (1900–1990), German evolutionary biologist and ornithologist
Daniel Rensch (born 1985), American chess master
Devyne Rensch (born 2003), Dutch footballer
Katharina Rensch (born 1964), German gymnast
René Rensch (born 1969), German rowing cox

See also
Rensch's rule, biological rule on allometrics